Xome is a harsh noise project from Sacramento, composed solely of Bob Scott (also known as Bob Sato). Though formed in 1989, Xome did not perform live until 1994 in Tokyo.

Xome's music is created by improvised manipulation of sound processing equipment.

Xome has performed with artists such as Incapacitants, C.C.C.C., Killer Bug, Merzbow, Otomo Yoshihide, Seiichi Yamamoto, Violent Onsen Geisha, Pain Jerk, Death Squad, Government Alpha, TV Pow, Daniel Menche, Kazumoto Endo, K2, Emil Beaulieau, Melt Banana, MSBR, Stimbox, Prurient, Thomas Dimuzio, Cock E.S.P., Pedestrian Deposit, Black Leather Jesus, T.E.F., Sickness, Cerebral Roil, Pop Culture Rape Victim, Vertonen, Guilty Connector, and others.

Discography
Face 23 (1994)
split with Stimbox (1995)
Blind Frenchies and Pork (1995)
split with Dyslexis Coup (1996)
split with Cock E.S.P. (1996)
Roase Chicken (1996)
TaVe 23.4 (1996)
Rebirth (video, 1997)
split with Death Squad (1997)
Harvest (1997)
Sushi (1997)
Glue for the Masses (1998)
split with Merzbow (1998)
Bolt (2000)
Goodbye Yesterday and Hello Tomorrow (2000)
Q thru W (2000)
Live at Ikebukuro Cyber (2000)
Party (2001)
23 Minutes (2001)
Fur (2002)
Itch (2002)
Blackness (2002)
split with DCLXVI (2002)
Endemoniado split with Third Organ (2003)
split with Stimbox (2004)
Xome vs. Oscillating Innards split (2004)
Switch (2005)
Battle of Primordial Energy Manifesting in Matter split with EcoMorti and Tralphaz (2006)
Deluxe Incinerator split with Sixes and Goat (2006)

External links
Official Xome site

American experimental musicians
American noise musicians